M. K. Stalin ministry, is the Council of Ministers headed by M. K. Stalin that was formed after the DMK won the 2021 Tamil Nadu Legislative Assembly elections. The new assembly formed was 16th Tamil Nadu Assembly. The Council assumed office on 7 May 2021. The ministry had a total of 34 ministers in the Cabinet at the time of swearing in compared to 30 ministers in the previous government. M. K. Stalin sworn in as 21st Chief Minister of Tamil Nadu, 8th person to hold this position.

Council of Ministers

Work
In June 2021, CM Stalin announced that the law ministry will review the legal cases filed by the previous government. The Tamil Nadu government under Stalin withdrew legal cases against the press and the protestors seeking the repeal of the three farm laws promulgated by the Union government, Citizenship Amendment Act, methane extraction, neutrino project, Kudankulam Nuclear Power Plant and the Chennai-Salem Expressway project.

References

Dravida Munnetra Kazhagam
S
2020s in Tamil Nadu
2021 establishments in Tamil Nadu
Cabinets established in 2021
2021 in Indian politics
Lists of current Indian state and territorial ministries
Stalin